Tshutshu Tshakasua (born 15 May 1997) is a Congolese-born Swedish footballer who plays for Gefle IF, as a forward.

References

External links

1997 births
Living people
Association football forwards
Swedish footballers
Sweden youth international footballers
Gefle IF players
Allsvenskan players
Superettan players
Democratic Republic of the Congo emigrants to Sweden